Ronald Edwin Tober (born 21 April 1945) is a Dutch singer, known for representing the Netherlands in the Eurovision Song Contest 1968 with the song "Morgen".

Early life
Tober was born in Bussum, Netherlands, but moved to the United States with his family at the age of three. He grew up in Albany, New York.

Career

Early career 
Invited to appear on "The Teen Age Barn", a television show on the channel WRGB, he performed every week for several years. During this time, he appeared on television as a guest of singer Perry Como, performing "O Holy Night" together. He was also a guest star on the CBS series Route 66 with George Maharis and Martin Milner, and appeared on The Ed Sullivan Show.

Tober went on to perform for several notable people, including Senator John F. Kennedy, Vice-President Richard Nixon, and Governors W. Averell Harriman and Nelson Rockefeller.

Tober played the role of Tony in the musical The Boy Friend and Billy Jester in Little Mary Sunshine. After being introduced to songwriter and record producer Bob Crewe, Tober recorded his first record in 1959 entitled "Who Taught You How To Love".

Return to the Netherlands
In 1963, while in the Netherlands to visit his grandmother, he appeared on Voor de vuist weg, a television show hosted by Willem Duys. Based on the positive reactions to his performance, he decided to move back to the Netherlands. He signed with Phonogram/Philips and produced his first Dutch record "Iedere avond" in 1964.

In 1966, he participated in the Sopot International Song Festival in Sopot, Poland, with the medley "Showtime on Broadway". 

In 1968, he won the Dutch national selection for the Eurovision Song Contest and represented the Netherlands in the Eurovision Song Contest 1968 held in London, United Kingdom, with the song "Morgen". He finished in sixteenth place with only one point.

Tober has had TV shows with the broadcasting organizations AVRO and KRO, and his guests have included Vikki Carr, Roger Whittaker and Nancy Wilson.

Personal life
Tober married Jan Jochems, who he has been in a relationship with since 1968, on 24 February 1998. In 1999, Tober was diagnosed with bladder cancer and underwent chemotherapy.

On 27 December 2003, during his 40th year in show business, Tober was invested as a Knight of the Order of Orange-Nassau by Queen Beatrix of the Netherlands. Tober's name is also inscribed on the Wall of Fame in the Zuiderkerk in Amsterdam.

Philanthropy
In 2002, Tober founded the Ronnie Tober Foundation to help assist people with a developmental disability through cultural and musical works. In 2007, Tober, his husband, and their friends raised €10,000 for his foundation by completing the International Four Days Marches Nijmegen.

Discography

Who Taught You How To Love – 1959
Iedere Avond – 1964
Al Jolson Hits − 1965
Geweldig − 1965
Geweldig/Iedere Avond − 1965
Marijke Uit Krabbendijke – 1965
Verboden Vruchten – 1965
Wat Was Jouw Bedoeling – 1965
The Ronnie Tober Show – 1965
Tunes van Toen – 1965
Merci Cherie – 1966
More Than Love – 1966
Niets Dan Zorgen Geeft Zij Mij – 1966
Zij Draagt Mijn Naam – 1966
De Beste van Ronnie Tober – 1966
Sopot 1966 – 1966
Onbereikbaar Ver – 1967
Put Your Head on My Shoulder – 1967
Alleluja No. 1 – 1968
Mexico – 1968
Morgen – 1968
Someday – 1968
Ronnie's Songparade – 1968
Ronnie's Songparade 2 – 1968
Arrivederci Ans – 1969
M'n Papegaai – 1969
Wiederseh'n – 1969
Waar Zijn de Dagen – 1969
Ronnie Tober Successen – 1969
Christina – 1970
Carmen – 1971
Laat Me Niet Alleen – 1971
Voor Sandra – 1971
Kerstfeest Met Ronnie Tober – 1971
Een Vuist Vol Hollandse Hits! – 1971
Alle 13 Goed deel 1 – 1971
Met Een Roos in Je Blonde Haren – 1972
Joseph, Joseph – 1972
Petite Mademoiselle – 1972
Ronnie & Gonnie – Met liedjes het land in – 1972
Alweer Alle 13 Goed – 1972
Het Beste Uit...Muziek in uw Straatje – 1972
Gitte, Bitte – 1973
Petites Mesdemoiselles – 1973
Yesterdays Dreams – 1973
Hollands Kwartet – 1973
Vol Met Super! deel 1–1973
Een Witte Eend – 1974
Mama Weet Wat Goed Is – 1974
Koelewijk Behoeft Geen Frans – 1974
Met Vlag en Wimpel! – 1974
Prima! Prima! – 1974
Alleen – 1975
Een Heel Gelukkig Kerstfeest – 1975
Een Witte Eend – 1975
Naar de Kermis – 1975
Petite Mademoiselle – 1975
Alle 13 Goed! deel 8 – 1975
Liedjes van Johnny Holshuysen – 1975
Tanz Mit Mir Samba Margarita – 1976
Pootje Baaien – 1977
Rosemarie – 1977
Speel Nog Een Liedje Orgelman – 1977
Dat Was 'n Kus – 1978
15 Jaar Ronnie Tober – 1978
De Zon in M'n Hart – 1979
Glory Glory Halleluja – 1979
You Are My Sunshine – 1979
Love me with all of your heart – 1980
De Zon in M'n Hart – 1980
Ik Ben Zo Eenzaam Zonder Jou – 1981
Dubbel Goud – 1981
Christmas Around The World – 1981
Olé Espana – 1982
Zomer, Zon en Witte Stranden – 1983
Leven Met Jou – 1986
Afscheid Nemen Doet Pijn – 1987
Lolita – 1987
De Nacht Van M'n Dromen – 1988
Holland Amerika Story – 1988
Voor Altijd en Eeuwig – 1988
25 Jaar Ronnie Tober – 1988
Zilver – 1988
4 Gouden Hits – 1989
Morgen Schijnt de Zon Voor Jou – 1989
Jij Bent 't Helemaal – 1990
Zoals ik ben – 1990
'n Lange Hete Zomer – 1991
Ronnie Tober & Gonnie Baars – 28 Populaire Liedjes – 1991
Ronnie Tober Nu – 2008
Ronnie Tober & Willeke D'estell – Kom in m'n armen – 2010
Ronnie Tober & Willeke D'estell – De zomer komt weer gauw – 2011
De Mooiste Duetten Aller Tijden – 2011
Terug in de Tijd – 2011 
Er is niemand zoals jij – 2012
Ronnie Tober & Belinda Kinnaer – Het zijn van die kleine dingen – 2012
Marco de Hollander & Ronnie Tober – Twee artiesten, hand in hand – 2012
Kom in mijn armen vannacht – 2012
Altijd – 2012
Dank U Majesteit – 2013
Duet with René Riva
Majesteit, ik vind u geweldig – 2013
Van Toen naar het Heden – 2013
Duet with Edwin van Hoevelaak
Ronnie Tober & Friends – 2013
Ronnie Tober & Belinda Kinnaer – Geluk − 2014
Vaarwel, Adios... – 2015

References

Other sources
Biography (in Dutch)

External links

Official website (in Dutch)
Ronnie Tober Foundation

1945 births
Living people
Eurovision Song Contest entrants for the Netherlands
Eurovision Song Contest entrants of 1968
People from Bussum
Dutch LGBT singers
Dutch gay musicians
Gay singers
Philips Records artists
Nationaal Songfestival contestants
20th-century Dutch LGBT people
21st-century Dutch LGBT people